La tesis de Nancy  is a 1962 novel written by Ramón J. Sender. It uses a humoristic style about Spanish folklore, and Protestantism. Mi amigo invisible, by Guillermo Fesser, is considered a new version of this novel; and Saliendo de la Estación de Atocha is also considered an updating. It was a best-seller.

References

1962 novels
1962 in Spain
Spanish comedy novels
Spanish folklore
Protestantism in Spain